Dova Haw, also known as Crab Island, is a small islet that is one of the Islands of Furness. Previously, Dova Haw was the site of an oil lamp lighthouse built from stone, whose foundations are still visible. Also known as Crab Island people back in the past went crab fishing there.

Islands of Furness
Tidal islands of England